Jean-Pierre Lola Kisanga (10 June 1969 – 1 December 2020) was a Congolese politician.

Biography
Kisanga served as Congolese Minister of Higher Education until 15 November 2005, when he was appointed by President Joseph Kabila to succeed Théo Baruti as Governor of the Oriental Province. He retained this position until 24 February 2007, when he was succeeded by Médard Autsai Asenga. He also served as a spokesperson for the Rally for Congolese Democracy–Goma.

Kisanga died from Covid-19 in 2020.

References

Democratic Republic of the Congo politicians
1969 births
2020 deaths
People from Haut-Uélé
21st-century Democratic Republic of the Congo people
Deaths from the COVID-19 pandemic in the Democratic Republic of the Congo